Lake Beloye ( — literally White lake) is a lake in Klepikovsky District, Ryazan Oblast, Russia. It is notable for its relatively great depth for the region -  - created as a deep gouge in the landscape in the most recent glaciation. The lake is located in the Meshchyera Lowlands, a glacial alluvial plain of swampy lowlands, gravelly moraines and limestone bedrock. The canal was filled in 2009. Lake Beloye is surrounded by pine forests, with reeds and sedge predominating on the shore. It is a popular lake for recreation and fishing, being home to pike, carp and other fish.

Lake Beloye was classified in 1974 as a "Nature Monument of Regional Importance", for its "scientific, cultural, educational and health" value (World Database of Protected Places ID #206212).  The site records the presence several species listed as vulnerable in the Red Book of Russia, including the Viviparous lizard, the reptile living the farthest north.
  It is part of Meshchersky National Park.

See also
 List of lakes in Russia
 Meshchersky National Park

References

External links
 Official site - Ryazan Nature Areas

Lakes of Ryazan Oblast